The gens Pontiliena was an obscure plebeian family at ancient Rome.  No members of this gens appear in history, but a few are mentioned in inscriptions.

Origin
The nomen Pontilienus appears to be formed from Pontilius, another nomen gentilicium.  The philologist George Davis Chase describes a class of such nomina, ending in -enus and nearly always derived from other gentile names, rather than places.  The root of the name appears to be the Oscan praenomen Pompo or Pomptus, a cognate of the Latin praenomen Quintus.  Thus, Pontilienus and similar nomina, such as Pompilius and Pomponia are the Oscan equivalents of Latin names such as Quinctius and Quinctilius.

Members

 Gaius Pontilienus M. f., named in an inscription from Volubilis in Mauretania Tingitana.
 Gaius Pontilienus M. f., named in several inscriptions from Mal di Ventre in Sardinia.
 Gaius Pontilienus M. f., named in an inscription from Carthago Nova in Hispania Citerior.
 Marcus Pontilienus M. f., named in several inscriptions from Mal di Ventre, and one from Capo Carbonara in Sardinia.

See also
 List of Roman gentes

References

Bibliography
 Wilhelm Henzen, Ephemeris Epigraphica: Corporis Inscriptionum Latinarum Supplementum (Journal of Inscriptions: Supplement to the Corpus Inscriptionum Latinarum, abbreviated EE), Institute of Roman Archaeology, Rome (1872–1913).
 René Cagnat et alii, L'Année épigraphique (The Year in Epigraphy, abbreviated AE), Presses Universitaires de France (1888–present).

Roman gentes